The SpongeBob Movie: Sponge on the Run is a 2020 American live-action/computer-animated adventure comedy film based on the animated television series SpongeBob SquarePants. Written and directed by series co-developer and former writer Tim Hill, who co-wrote the story with Jonathan Aibel and Glenn Berger, it is the first film in the franchise to be fully animated in stylized CGI rather than traditional 2D animation. The regular voice cast of the series reprise their respective roles from the series and the previous films and including new characters (both live-action and animated) performed by Awkwafina, Snoop Dogg, Tiffany Haddish, Keanu Reeves, Danny Trejo, and Reggie Watts. The film follows the origin of how SpongeBob met Gary the Snail, and SpongeBob's quest to rescue him after he is kidnapped. It is the third theatrical film based on the series, following the first in 2004 and second in 2015. The film is dedicated to creator Stephen Hillenburg, who died in 2018, and also served as an executive producer on the project.

The film was produced by Paramount Animation, Nickelodeon Movies, and United Plankton Pictures, with animation provided by Mikros Image. Originally slated for a worldwide theatrical release by Paramount Pictures, plans were changed due to the COVID-19 pandemic. The film was released theatrically in Canada on August 14, 2020, digitally on Netflix in other territories on November 5, 2020. It was released as a premium video-on-demand offering and a Paramount+ launch title in the United States on March 4, 2021. Sponge on the Run received generally positive reviews from critics, with praise for the animation and loyalty to the series. The film was nominated for Favorite Animated Movie at the 2022 Kids' Choice Awards, but lost to Encanto. A fourth film is currently in development with a release date of May 23, 2025.

Plot
In Bikini Bottom, Plankton works on a new plan to steal the Krabby Patty formula while Karen argues that SpongeBob is actually responsible for all his previous failures and not Mr. Krabs. Meanwhile, in Atlantic City, selfish ruler King Poseidon uses up all the slime from his latest sea snail, which is necessary to maintain his appearance. Poseidon decrees the obtaining of a new snail, and Plankton kidnaps SpongeBob's pet snail Gary so that SpongeBob will no longer interfere with his plans. The next morning, SpongeBob learns from Patrick that Gary was taken to Atlantic City. As part of his plan, Plankton offers Otto, a robot built by Sandy, to take them to the city with the hopes that they never return. Without SpongeBob cooking Krabby Patties, the Krusty Krab's enraged customers trash the restaurant despite Mr. Krabs and Squidward's efforts to stop them. 

Otto drives SpongeBob and Patrick to an old Western town where they meet a tumbleweed spirit named Sage. Sage reveals to SpongeBob and Patrick that they are dreaming, and must overcome a special mission to continue their search. He gives them a "Challenge Coin" that will give them bravery to enter into a tavern haunted by ghostly zombie pirates. SpongeBob and Patrick discover that the pirates' souls are trapped by an evil spirit known as "El Diablo", and decide to help free them. Diablo traps the duo in his office, where they accidentally disintegrate him. The pirates' souls are freed, and SpongeBob and Patrick are woken up by Otto.

Now accompanied by Sage, SpongeBob discovers that as soon as Gary's slime runs out, Poseidon will have him enslaved with the rest of his previous snails. Arriving at Atlantic City, Sage warns the pair not to be distracted by the city's attractions, but they ignore his warnings. After a fun-filled night, SpongeBob and Patrick discover that they have lost the "Challenge Coin" that allowed them to be brave, but they nonetheless enter Poseidon's palace. When they try to take Gary, both are arrested and imprisoned in the dungeon.

Back in Bikini Bottom, Plankton arrives at the Krusty Krab. Mr. Krabs willingly gives him the formula, feeling depressed without SpongeBob. However, seeing Mr. Krabs so upset makes Plankton feel guilty. Upon finding out that SpongeBob and Patrick will be executed in a luxury show in Poseidon's palace, Mr. Krabs, Squidward, Sandy, and a redeemed Plankton decide to save them.

In prison, Sage reveals to SpongeBob and Patrick that the "Challenge Coin" never had powers and that the bravery came from themselves. Before SpongeBob is executed, Mr. Krabs, Squidward, Plankton, and Sandy burst into the show to testify in favor of SpongeBob. Along with Patrick, each recounts an experience they had with SpongeBob at a summer camp, earning the audience's gratitude. Afterwards, the group perform a musical number to distract Poseidon and take Gary. Poseidon realizes the distraction and orders his guards to capture the group. SpongeBob and his friends manage to escape the guards and head towards the exit, but are once again cornered when Otto leaves them behind.

Poseidon offers to drop charges against the group on the condition that SpongeBob leaves Gary with him. SpongeBob refuses, arguing that his friends decided to rescue him even if they risked death. When Poseidon finds out that he has no friends and reveals that he needs the slime for his appearance, SpongeBob offers to be his friend. Poseidon removes all his arrangements and return to his true appearance. Everyone accepts his appearance, and Poseidon allows SpongeBob to take Gary back home. Poseidon releases all his enslaved snails to accompany them and Bikini Bottom ends up becoming a "sea snail refuge".

Cast

Live-action
 Keanu Reeves as Sage
 Snoop Dogg as The Gambler
 Danny Trejo as El Diablo

Voices
The series' regular voice cast reprised their roles for the film.
 Tom Kenny as
 SpongeBob SquarePants
 Antonio Raul Corbo as Young SpongeBob
 Gary the Snail
 French Narrator
 Bill Fagerbakke as Patrick Star
 Jack Gore as Young Patrick
 Rodger Bumpass as Squidward Tentacles
 Jason Maybaum as Young Squidward
 Clancy Brown as Mr. Krabs
 Mr. Lawrence as Plankton
 Jill Talley as Karen
 Carolyn Lawrence as Sandy Cheeks
 Presley Williams as Young Sandy
 Mary Jo Catlett as Mrs. Puff
 Tim Hill as Documentary Narrator
 Matt Berry as King Poseidon
 Awkwafina as Otto
 Tiffany Haddish as Master of Ceremonies
 Reggie Watts as Chancellor
 Dee Bradley Baker as Perch Perkins
 Rick Pasqualone as a dealer
 Aaron Smith De Niro as a security guard
 Tyler Peterson as Poseidon Concierge

Pearl Krabs (voiced by Lori Alan) also appears in a deleted scene that is included on the film's Blu-Ray release.

Additional voices by Steve Alterman, Stephen Apostolina, Kirk Baily, Ashley Bell, Mitch Carter, David Cowgill, Wendy Cutler, Romy Cutler-Lengyel, Juliet Donnenfeld, Julie Falls, Peter Falls, Jeff Fischer, Jackie Gonneau, Richard Steven Horvitz, Camryn Jones, Joyce Kurtz, Joanna Leeds, Hope Levy, Scott Menville, Edie Mirman, Capri Oliver, Davis Pak, Paul Pape, Benjamin Plessala, Juan Pope, Michelle Ruff, Aryan Simhadri, Michael Sorich, Warren Sroka, Kensington Tallman, Benjamin Valic, Lynnanne Zager

Production

Development
In a February 2015 interview discussing The SpongeBob Movie: Sponge Out of Water success at the box office, Megan Colligan, president of worldwide distribution and marketing at Paramount Pictures, stated the possibility of a third film was "a good bet." In another interview, Paramount vice-chairman Rob Moore remarked, "Hopefully, it won't take 10 years to make another film," in reference to the time passed between The SpongeBob SquarePants Movie (2004) and its 2015 sequel. Later in 2015, it was revealed that Paramount was developing sequels to its franchises, including another SpongeBob film.

The film was initially scheduled for release in 2019, before being delayed to 2020. By January 2016, Jonathan Aibel and Glenn Berger had been hired to write the film.

In March 2017, Paramount president Marc Evans announced that the studio would work closely with Viacom on its TV brands, including the SpongeBob film. During the same month, Yahoo! Entertainment stated that the film would be titled The SpongeBob Movie.

In April 2018, the film's official title was revealed as The SpongeBob Movie: It's a Wonderful Sponge, and SpongeBob co-developer Tim Hill was announced as director and writer for the film. It was reported later in the year that the film would be written by Aibel, Berger, and Michael Kvamme. The principal cast – Tom Kenny, Bill Fagerbakke, Clancy Brown, Mr. Lawrence, Rodger Bumpass, Carolyn Lawrence, Jill Talley, Mary Jo Catlett, and Lori Alan – are all expected to reprise the roles as their respective characters from the series and the previous films. In October 2018, at the VIEW Conference in Turin, Italy, Paramount Animation president Mireille Soria revealed the plot for the film. The same day, Hans Zimmer was announced as the composer for the film, while Paris and Montreal-based Mikros Image would handle animation for the film, which would be created entirely through computer animation.

On June 12, 2019, it was announced that Reggie Watts and Awkwafina were added to the cast while Cyndi Lauper and Rob Hyman, who wrote a song for The SpongeBob Musical, would be writing original songs for the film. It was also announced that Mia Michaels would be choreographing and Ali Dee Theodore would add an original song for the film. The next day, Snoop Dogg announced on Jimmy Kimmel Live! that he would be in the film.

On November 12, 2019, it was revealed that the film's title was changed from It's a Wonderful Sponge to Sponge on the Run, along with the casting of Keanu Reeves.

Filming
On January 22, 2019, it was confirmed that production on the film had officially begun. Like its predecessors, the film includes live-action sequences, and unlike the previous films, the animated sequences of the film are entirely computer-animated. Larry Fong was initially reported to serve as the film's cinematographer, but due to unknown reasons, Peter Lyons Collister ended up solely with the credit.

Music

Soundtrack 

Interscope Records released the film's soundtrack on March 5, 2021. Artists who are part of the original soundtrack include Tainy, Weezer, Snoop Dogg, The Flaming Lips, and Kenny G. Cyndi Lauper and Rob Hyman also co-wrote the track "Secret to the Formula". Previous material that are part of the film but not on the soundtrack album are "Slow Ride" by Foghat, "Dream Weaver" by Gary Wright, Weezer's cover of the a-ha song "Take On Me", and Kenny G's cover of "My Heart Will Go On" from the film Titanic. The score for the film was composed by Hans Zimmer and Steve Mazzaro. It marks as Zimmer's the second score for a Nickelodeon film, following Rango (2011), and his second score for a film based on an animated series, after The Simpsons Movie (2007)

Release

Theatrical and streaming
The SpongeBob Movie: Sponge on the Run was originally scheduled to be theatrically released on February 9, 2019, by Paramount Pictures. It was then pushed back to August 2, 2019, before being delayed nearly a year to July 31, 2020. It was moved four more times: to July 17, 2020, May 22, 2020,
July 31 (as a result of the COVID-19 pandemic), and finally August 7, 2020. In June 2020, it was announced that the film's theatrical release had been cancelled and it would instead be released through video on demand and CBS All Access (now Paramount+) in early 2021. In December 2020, it was revealed that the film would be releasing in February 2021. On January 28, 2021, it was announced that the film would release on March 4, 2021, the same day CBS All Access rebranded as Paramount+. In addition to the ViacomCBS streaming service, the film was available on Apple TV, Amazon Prime Video, Vudu, and other digital platforms.

In July 2020, Netflix acquired international distribution rights to the film, excluding the United States, Canada, and China. On July 30, 2020, Paramount Pictures Canada announced that the film would be released in Canadian theaters on August 14, 2020. Between the Netflix and Paramount+ deals, Paramount recouped the entire production cost of the film. The film was released internationally on Netflix on November 5, 2020.

Home media 
The SpongeBob Movie: Sponge on the Run was released on DVD and Blu-ray on February 2, 2021 in Canada. In the United States, the film was released on DVD and Blu-ray on July 13, 2021.

Reception

Box office 
In the film's debut Canadian weekend, it grossed $865,824 from 300 theaters. Since Canada's grosses are factored into American totals, Sponge on the Run finished first at the box office, and had the highest weekend total for a film since the start of the pandemic. IndieWire estimated that had the film had a traditional North American theatrical release it would have opened to $25–30 million, including a $3 million total from Canada. In its second weekend, despite being added to an additional 26 theaters, the film dropped 36% to $550,000, finishing second behind Unhinged. In its third weekend the film made $400,000 from 314 theaters, then $345,000 in its fourth weekend, for a month-long running total of $3.6 million.

VOD rentals 
In its first weekend of digital release in the United States, the film was the most rented title on FandangoNow, fourth on Google Play, and fifth on Apple TV.

Critical response 
The site's critics consensus reads, "Although its story may leave fans on the surface, The Spongebob Movie: Sponge on the Run is a wondrously wacky visit to Bikini Bottom that retains the charm of the original series." On Metacritic, it has a weighted average score of 65 out of 100 based on reviews from 20 critics, indicating "generally favorable reviews".

Writing for IndieWire, David Ehrlich gave the film a grade of B− and said, "Even the weakest bits get by on good vibes and meta-cleverness ([Keanu] Reeves has become something of a human meme in recent years, but Sponge on the Run milks the actor's brand for a number of solid laughs), and the animation is detailed and inventive enough for the whole film to feel drenched in SpongeBob's demented energy." Writing for CTV News, Richard Crouse gave the film 3.5 stars and wrote: "The SpongeBob Movie: Sponge on the Run brings with it the usual anarchy, inside jokes and unexpected celebrity cameos, but at its little osmotic heart is SpongeBob, a character who belongs to the same genus of entertainers as Soupy Sales, Stan Laurel and Pee-wee Herman." The Hollywood Reporters David Rooney called the film "fast, fun, [and] demented" and wrote: "The technological overhaul from 2D doesn't diminish the vibrant personalities of the character animation, and it's added an even trippier dimension to the surreal backgrounds. More immersive, if you will, even if its episodic action gets no prizes for storytelling discipline."

Aparita Bhandari of The Globe and Mail gave the film 1.5 out of 4 stars, writing: "I totally understand if the latest SpongeBob SquarePants movie spinoff will draw in longtime fans and new audiences brave enough to venture into a movie theatre this Friday... However, for me and my two kids (aged 10 and 8), this dive into the deep sea wasn't as thrilling an adventure as we'd hoped for."

Accolades 
At the 19th Visual Effects Society Awards the special effects team was nominated in the category "Outstanding Animated Character in an Animated Feature".

The film was nominated for four Nickelodeon Kids' Choice Awards in 2022, one for Favorite Animated Movie and three for Favorite Voice in an Animated Movie: Tom Kenny as SpongeBob, Awkwafina as Otto, and Keanu Reeves as Sage.

Television spin-off 

Kamp Koral: SpongeBob's Under Years is a SpongeBob SquarePants spin-off prequel series, based on the flashback scenes from The SpongeBob Movie: Sponge on the Run, that introduces a 10-year-old SpongeBob at a summer sleepaway camp.

On February 19, 2020, the official title was revealed, and it was announced that the series would be premiering in July 2020. The main series voice cast reprise their roles.

On July 30, 2020, it was announced that the series would be released on CBS All Access, the ViacomCBS streaming service as it was known then, in early 2021. On January 28, 2021, it was announced that the first six episodes of the series would release on March 4, 2021, the same day as the release of Sponge on the Run.

Future 
On August 24, 2021, during a video interview with CEO of Nickelodeon, Brian Robbins, he mentioned that "a new SpongeBob [is] in the works" when discussing about the studio's film slate. The film was officially announced in February 2022, with plans for it to be released theatrically. On November 10, 2022, the fourth film was given a release date of May 23, 2025.

References

External links
 
 

2020 films
2020 computer-animated films
2020 fantasy films
2020s American animated films
2020 comedy films
2020s children's adventure films
2020s children's animated films
2020s children's fantasy films
Interquel films
American films with live action and animation
American computer-animated films
American children's animated adventure films
American children's animated comedy films
Animated films about friendship
Animated films based on animated series
2020s English-language films
Films about kidnapping
Films about summer camps
Films based on television series
Films directed by Tim Hill
Films postponed due to the COVID-19 pandemic
Films produced by Stephen Hillenburg
Films scored by Hans Zimmer
Films set in the Pacific Ocean
Nickelodeon animated films
Nickelodeon Movies films
Paramount Animation films
Paramount Pictures animated films
Paramount Pictures films
SpongeBob SquarePants (film series)
SpongeBob SquarePants
Underwater civilizations in fiction
Paramount+ original films